Palaia Epidavros or Palaia Epidauros (also Palea Epidavros and Palea Epidauros; Greek: Παλαιά Επίδαυρος) is a small town in the Argolis prefecture of the Peloponnese . Today also called Archaia Epidauros (Αρχαία Επίδαυρος), it is built in the same place where was located the ancient city of Epidauros, on top of and surrounding a small peninsula between two bays, on the coast of the Saronic gulf. It is situated 34 km to the East of Nafplio and 60 km to the South of Korinthos. Its population is 1618 inhabitants according to the 2011 census.

Description
At the foot of the akropolis of Ancient Epidauros is located the so-called "Small Theatre of Epidauros" (not to be confused with the more famous theatre at the Sanctuary of Asklepios in Epidauros, some 10 km to the South-West Theatre of Epidaurus). This smaller theatre was built in the middle of the 4th century BCE. It was re-discovered in 1970 and excavated in 1972. Its capacity is 2000 seats. Every Summer cultural events take place in the theatre, under the title of "Musical July" but better known as a part of the much bigger annual "Athens-Epidauros Festival".

Since Palea Epidauros is a coastal town, there are a number of beaches. The most famous is Kalamaki beach. Other beaches are Polemarcha beach and Gialasi beach.

Historical population

References

External links

Municipality of Epidavros

Villages in Greece
Populated places in Argolis